Galtara colettae is a moth of the subfamily Arctiinae. It was described by Hervé de Toulgoët in 1976. It is found on the Comoros.

References

 

Nyctemerina
Moths described in 1976